Róbert Kovaľ (born 16 January 1994) is a former Slovak football midfielder who last played for FK Dukla Prague.

Club
He made his debut for MFK Zemplín Michalovce against FK Slovan Duslo Šaľa on 23 April 2011 at the age of 17.

FK Dukla Prague
He joined FK Dukla Prague in February 2014, signing a three and a half year contract. He made his professional debut for the club against SK Slavia Prague on 28 February 2014.

Career statistics

References

External links

FK Dukla Prague profile 
Uefa profile

1994 births
Living people
Slovak footballers
Slovak expatriate footballers
Association football midfielders
Slovak Super Liga players
2. Liga (Slovakia) players
Czech First League players
Czech National Football League players
MFK Zemplín Michalovce players
FK Dukla Prague players
SK Dynamo České Budějovice players
Sportspeople from Humenné
Slovak expatriate sportspeople in the Czech Republic
Expatriate footballers in the Czech Republic